José De Gregorio Rebeco (born August 17, 1959) is a Chilean economist, academic, researcher, consultant and politician.
He has been the Governor of the Central Bank of Chile, Minister of the Economy, Mining and Energy during the administration of Ricardo Lagos and is currently the Dean of the School of Economics and Business of the Universidad de Chile. He is also a nonresident Senior Fellow at the Peterson Institute for International Economics.

Biography

He is the son of José De Gregorio Aroca, who was Secretary General of the Christian Democratic Party during the governments of Eduardo Frei Montalva, Salvador Allende, and even for some time in hiding under the regime of Augusto Pinochet, and of María Rebeco Castro, professor, who was the Headmistress of the Liceo Nº1 Javiera Carrera for girls. 
In 1984, he married Soledad Aninat and they have 4 children.

Studies
He completed his primary and secondary school studies at the Luis Campino Institute of Humanities in Santiago de Chile. He then studied Industrial Engineering at the Universidad de Chile, going on to study a Masters in Industrial Engineering from the same university, where he received the "Marcos Orrego Puelma" award for the best graduate of his promotion. 
He obtained his Doctorate (Ph. D.) in Economics in 1990 from the Massachusetts Institute of Technology (MIT) in the United States. His doctoral thesis was entitled "Essays in Economic Fluctuations, Inflation and Financial Innovation".

Ministerial and Central Bank Positions

From 1994 to 1997 De Gregorio worked in the Ministry of Finance as coordinator of Macroeconomic Policies during the management of Eduardo Aninat, replacing his predecessor Joaquín Vial.
In 2000, he was appointed by the newly elected President Ricardo Lagos as Minister of the Economy and Mining, as well as Minister of the National Energy Commission (CNE), assuming as tri-minister on March 11 of that year, on the same day that Lagos took over as President of Chile.
He left the ministries in June 2001 to serve as an advisor to the Central Bank, after overcoming José Pablo Arellano and Ricardo Ffrench-Davis in an unofficial internal competition. In that institution he held the position left by Pablo Piñera, brother of President Sebastián Piñera, who did not complete his term after leaving as Director of the public television channel. Therefore, De Gregrorio´s position had to be confirmed twice by the Senate: the first time for six months and the second time for ten years. In 2003, he assumed the vice president of the Central Bank.

Central Bank Governor

In December 2007, he was appointed by President Michelle Bachelet as Chairman of the Board of the Central Bank of Chile, replacing Vittorio Corbo.
His main challenge in assuming as president of the issuing institution was to stop the advance of inflation. The shock derived from the greater international value of food and energy meant that, in mid-2008, the established inflation goal of 2-4% per year was long exceeded, standing at 9.5% in the 12 months to July. To combat this situation, the Central Bank began to drastically raise its interest rates (called the Monetary Policy Rate), with the well-known risks of lower growth that this decision implied. This policy had to be abruptly modified in the face of the global economic crisis unleashed at the end of the third quarter of that year.
De Gregorio was responsible for presiding over the Central Bank during the global financial crisis, following an aggressive monetary policy. The monetary policy rate was cut from 8.25% at the end of 2018 to 0.5% in July 2009, being the largest rate reduction in Latin America. New instruments were also designed to provide liquidity and a forward guidance policy was also carried out, once the interest rate reached its minimum.
While he was president of the Central Bank, he was also the governor of Chile at the IMF and participated in the IMFC (International Monetary and Financial Committee) in 2010 and 2011.

Academic work
De Gregorio has published widely in international academic reviews and books on issues including stabilization policies, foreign exchange regimes and economic growth. He has served as a referee for several academic journals and is an associate editor with the journals International Tax and Public Finance and Latin American Economic Review. He is also a member of the Executive Committee of the Latin American and Caribbean Economic Association (Lacea) and was co-director of the organizing committee for the annual Lacea meeting in 1999.

De Gregorio is a full professor at the University of Chile (on leave). In 1997 and 2000 he was professor and head of post-graduate programs at the Center of Applied Economics at the University of Chile, where he has taught macroeconomics and international economics since 1994. He also served on the executive of the Latin American Doctoral Program in Economics, carried out jointly by Mexico’s ITAM, Torcuato di Tella University, Argentina, and the University of Chile. 

He is a non-resident senior fellow of the Peterson Institute of International Economics (PIIE). He is also a member of the Latin American Committee on Macroeconomic and Financial Issues (CLAAF). He was also a part-time professor at the Pontifical Catholic University between 2003 and 2011, and a visiting professor at the Anderson School of Management at the University of California – Los Angeles (UCLA), where he was teaching when he was appointed Minister by President Lagos.

He has published more than 100 articles in international academic journals and books on the topics of monetary policy, exchange rates, international finance, and economic growth; and has served as an arbitrator and member of editorial committees of various academic journals. One of his most important articles is "How Foreign Direct Investment Affects Economic Growth", published in the Journal of International Economics in 1998, written with Eduardo Borensztein and Jong-Wha Lee.
For several years now, he has been the best ranking academic in publications and citations in Latin America and in the top 5% globally in the Ideas Repec bibliographic base..

Other contributions
He is a founding partner and director of Espacio Público and Chairman of the Sovereign Funds Investment Committee of the Ministry of Finance. He was a member of the Committee on International Economic Policy and Reform of the Brookings Institution, and on the Steering Committee of the Latin American and Caribbean Economic Association (LACEA).
He is also part of the MIT Sloan Latin America Advisory Council. He was a member of the High Commission on Academic Hierarchy at Diego Portales University and part of the Group of Trustees of the Principles for Stable Capital Flows and Fair Debt Restructuring of the Institute of International Finance.
He was an economist in the Research Department of the International Monetary Fund (IMF) during 1990 and 1994 and a consultant to international organizations such as the World Bank, Inter-American Development Bank (IDB) and the United Nations.
Between 1983 and 1986 he was a Researcher for the Corporation of Studies for Latin America (CIEPLAN) of the United Nations.
2016- 2018: Chairman of the Senior Council, CEBRA, Central Bank Research Association.
2011: President of the Consultation Council for the Americas (CCA) of the Bank for International Settlements.
He is part of various directories and also advises companies on economic and financial matters.
Thinking
Although he has defined himself as liberal in the economic field, but conservative in his values system (he is a Roman Catholic), others consider him, above all, a pragmatic economist who has followed the line of his mentor, Rudiger Dornbusch, one of the most important economists in the area of international macroeconomics of the second half of the 20th century and mentor to various global economic authorities and leading academics.
During the difficult years between 1998 and 1999, he was critical of the policies of the Central Bank, since he was in favor of a different combination of policies with a lower interest rate and a more flexible exchange rate.
He was also critical of the proposed labor reform shortly before the election of Ricardo Lagos, being contrary to the idea of inter-company negotiation.

Awards and honors

 	“Marcos Orrego Puelma” for the best graduate student of his Civil Engineering promotion at the Universidad de Chile, 1984.
 	“Outstanding Industrial Engineer” delivered by the Industrial Civil Engineers Corporation (ICI), Universidad de Chile, 2008.
 	“Central Banker of the year in Latin America for 2008”, The Banker London.
 	“Central Banker of the year in Latin America for 2008”, Emerging Markets, Istanbul, 2009.
 	“Economists of the year” by the newspaper El Mercurio, 2011.
 	“Monetary Club Award”, Universidad Finis Terrae 2011, inaugural prize.
 	“To the Engineer for Distinguished Actions”, Institute of Engineers of Chile, 2012.

Books
 MF Reform: The Unfinished Agenda, co-authors: Barry Eichengreen, Takatoshi Ito, and Charles Wyplosz, Geneva Reports on the World Economy 20, CEPR Press, 2018. 
 How Latin American Weathered the Global Financial Crisis, Peterson Institute of International Economics, 2014.
 Macroeconomía. Teoría y Políticas, Pearson Educación, Prentice-Hall, 2007.
 An Independent and Accountable IMF, co-authors: Barry Eichengreen, Takatoshi Ito, and Charles Wyplosz, Geneva Reports on the World Economy 1, CEPR Press, 1999.

References

External links
 	 Wikimedia Commons hosts a multimedia category about José De Gregorio.
 	Biography on webpage of the Central Bank of Chile.
 	Presentation in English as president of the Central Bank.

Presidents of the Central Bank of Chile
Chilean Ministers of Economy
Christian Democratic Party (Chile) politicians
1959 births
Living people
MIT School of Humanities, Arts, and Social Sciences alumni
Chilean Ministers of Mining
Peterson Institute for International Economics
21st-century Chilean  economists
20th-century Chilean  economists